Christoph Freitag (born 21 January 1990) is an Austrian footballer who plays for Vorwärts Steyr.

Club career
On 25 June 2015 Christoph Freitag signed for Wacker Innsbruck from Wiener Neustadt on a free transfer.

On 21 June 2021, he joined Vorwärts Steyr on a two-year contract.

References

External links

1990 births
Living people
Austrian footballers
Association football midfielders
FC Lustenau players
SC Wiener Neustadt players
FC Wacker Innsbruck (2002) players
SC Austria Lustenau players
SK Vorwärts Steyr players
Austrian Football Bundesliga players
2. Liga (Austria) players
People from Judenburg
Footballers from Styria